Dreesen is a surname. Notable people with the surname include:

 Bill Dreesen (1904–1971), American baseball player
 Liesbet Dreesen (born 1976), Belgian swimmer
 Tim Dreesen (born 1987), Belgian footballer
 Tom Dreesen (born 1939), American stand-up comedian
 Willi Dreesen (1928–2013), Swiss painter and sculptor